Jorge Fausto Arteaga Castillo (born 29 December 1966) is a retired Peruvian international footballer.

Career
Born in Lima, Peru, Arteaga played for local giants Sporting Cristal and several other clubs in Peru. Arteaga made 19 appearances for the Peru national football team from 1989 to 1993. He participated in the 1991 Copa América and helped his country to the quarterfinals in the 1993 edition in Ecuador.

References

External links

1966 births
Living people
Footballers from Lima
Association football defenders
Peruvian footballers
Peru international footballers
1987 Copa América players
1989 Copa América players
1991 Copa América players
Peruvian Primera División players
Sporting Cristal footballers
Sport Boys footballers
Deportivo Municipal footballers
FBC Melgar footballers
Alianza Atlético footballers
Juan Aurich footballers
Alianza Atlético managers
León de Huánuco managers